Robert Bringhurst Tanguy (January 24, 1927 – August 20, 2021) was a United States Air Force major general who served as Commandant of the Armed Forces Staff College from 1980 to 1981. He was a graduate of the United States Military Academy (1952).

References

1927 births
2021 deaths
United States Air Force generals
United States Military Academy alumni
People from Logansport, Indiana